Hickory Plains is an unincorporated community in Prairie County, Arkansas, United States. Hickory Plains has a post office with ZIP code 72066.

References

Unincorporated communities in Prairie County, Arkansas
Unincorporated communities in Arkansas